Laura Lynch may refer to:

Laura Lynch (musician), former member of The Dixie Chicks
Laura Lynch (journalist), Canadian radio and television journalist